In mathematics, the Andreotti–Grauert theorem, introduced by ,  gives conditions for cohomology groups of coherent sheaves over complex manifolds to vanish or to be finite-dimensional.

References

Complex manifolds
Theorems in abstract algebra